Nancy Davis (1921–2016) was an American actress and, as Nancy Reagan, First Lady of the United States.

Nancy Davis may also refer to:

Nancy D. Griffeth (Nancy Davis Griffeth, born 1945), American computer scientist
Jan Davis (Nancy Jan Davis, born 1953), American astronaut
Nancy Davis (businesswoman) (born c. 1977), American investor and businesswoman

See also
Nan Davis (born 1962), American champion long-distance runner, a/k/a Nan Doak-Davis